Calathus granatensis is a species of ground beetle from the Platyninae subfamily that is endemic to Spain.

References

granatensis
Beetles described in 1866
Endemic fauna of Spain
Beetles of Europe